Zendoku is a 2007 puzzle video game developed by Zoonami and published by Eidos Interactive for the Nintendo DS and PlayStation Portable handheld consoles.

Gameplay

Zendoku is a variation of Sudoku, offering a slightly more combative experience than simply lining up numbers. Players must now insert symbols, rather than the standard numbers. Players choose characters and choose to attack or defend against a challenger, which takes place via mini-games started upon filling in a group of numbers. The game is set against anime-influenced backdrops and has a "light-hearted martial arts" theme. The game also offers single-player puzzles.

Development and release
Zendoku was developed by Zoonami and published by Eidos Interactive for the Nintendo DS and PlayStation Portable handheld consoles. According to Zoonami CEO Martin Hollis, the game's focus is on fun and innovation, stating that the company wanted to turn "a familiar paper and pencil game into a puzzling, battling, micro-gaming, fighting extravaganza." In North America, Zendoku was released to retailers on June 18, 2007.

Reception
Zendoku received generally mixed reviews from critics. The UK Nintendo Magazine, ONM praised the DS version of the game for its colourful graphics, but criticized it for the confusing system of using symbols instead of numbers, as well as the minigames feeling tacked on and more of an annoyance, but finished by saying, "One for multiplayer only".

NGamer praised the multiplayer game highly, saying, "The thrill of using logical reasoning to kick someone's arse is a phenomenal experience."

References

External links
 

2007 video games
Eidos Interactive games
Multiplayer and single-player video games
Nintendo DS games
PlayStation Portable games
Puzzle video games
Sudoku video games
Video games developed in the United Kingdom